Lami Phillips Gbadamosi (born in Chicago, Illinois), is a Nigerian singer, songwriter and actress. She is United Nations (UN) envoy and Oxfam Ambassador for Women and Youths.

Early life
Phillips was born in Chicago, Illinois. and later moved to Nigeria with her parents and siblings where she attended elementary school at Corona School, Victoria Island. She later moved back to England in her teenage years and lived there for about eleven years. At the time she was in the UK studying, she took vocal lessons and also joined the choir at her church (Jesus 

House, UK).

Educational background
Phillips went to Corona School, Victoria Island, Lagos for her elementary schooling. She also completed her BA (Hons) at the University of Kent, United Kingdom, then obtained her MA degree from the University of Nottingham. Phillips also has an Executive MBA from the Pennsylvania State University.

Career
Having started her music career professionally, she has since released an Album "Intuition" and various singles such as; Baby, Orimiwu and Yago. She is currently the director of students and external affairs of the controversial private school Dowen College located in Lagos. Also into acting ' she acted in King of boys directed by Kemi Adetiba.

Personal life 
She is married  to a childhood friend f  Labo  Obowole Gbadamosi and they have two daughters.

References

Living people
Actresses from Chicago
Nigerian singer-songwriters
Alumni of the University of Kent
Alumni of the University of Nottingham
Smeal College of Business alumni
Year of birth missing (living people)
21st-century American women